Golovin (formerly Chinik, from  or) is a city in Nome Census Area, Alaska, United States. At the 2010 census the population was 156, up from 144 in 2000.

Geography
Golovin is located at  (64.544612, -163.027459).

Golovin is on a point of land between Golovnin Bay and Golovnin Lagoon on the Seward Peninsula in western Alaska. The area receives its name from Russian Vice-Admiral  Vasily Mikhailovich Golovnin, (1776–1831). The town name is misspelled while the bay and lagoon retain the correct spelling.

Demographics

The present city of Golovin appeared on the 1890 U.S. Census as the native village of Ikaleaveagmiut. In 1900, it would report as Cheennik Village (or Dexter), then an unincorporated village. It would not report again until 1930 when the name was officially reported as Golovin. It would formally incorporate as a city in 1971.

There also were reported the settlements of Golofnin Bay (population 25) and Golofnin City (village) (population 185) on the 1890 and 1900 censuses, but these may have been separate areas outside of the present day Golovin, with the former described as consisting of four small Inuit settlements (Siningmon, Netsekawik, Ukodlint & Chillimiut) on an unspecified location in the bay area. The 1900 census considered Golofnin City a successor to Golofnin Bay, though it appeared that this community was located at the site of the Golovin (or Golofnin) Mission, a Swedish Evangelical Union mission and reindeer station, which was along the west side of the Golovnin Bay (now since abandoned). To compound the confusion, a post office (called Golovin) was established at the mission in 1899, but closed in 1906. It was then relocated to the present Golovin in 1908 and kept the same name.

As of the census of 2000, there were 144 people, 45 households, and 30 families residing in the city. There were 54 housing units at an average density of 14.5 per square mile (5.6/km2). The racial makeup of the city was 7.64% White, 84.03% Native American, and 8.33% from two or more races. 2.78% of the population were Hispanic or Latino of any race.

Of the 45 households, 44.4% had children under the age of 18 living with them, 40.0% were married couples living together, 20.0% had a female householder with no husband present, and 33.3% were non-families. 31.1% of all households were made up of individuals, and 6.7% had someone living alone who was 65 years of age or older. The average household size was 3.20 and the average family size was 4.17.

In the city, the age distribution of the population shows 42.4% under the age of 18, 6.3% from 18 to 24, 28.5% from 25 to 44, 16.7% from 45 to 64, and 6.3% who were 65 years of age or older. The median age was 26 years. For every 100 females, there were 118.2 males. For every 100 females age 18 and over, there were 118.4 males.

The median income for a household in the city was $31,875, and the median income for a family was $41,250. Males had a median income of $25,625 versus $31,250 for females. The per capita income for the city was $13,281. There were none of the families and 4.3% of the population living below the poverty line, including no under eighteens and none of those over 64.

History
Golovin was originally an Inupiat village called Chiŋik.

Golovin was named for Captain Vasily Golovnin of the Russian Navy, who visited Alaska to inspect the workings of the Russian-American Company in 1807–1809, in the Diana, and in 1817–1819, in the Kamchatka, while circumnavigating the world. Lt. Lavrenty Zagoskin, from the Imperial Russian Navy sent to Alaska to scout locations for trading posts, reported the village as "Ikalikguigmyut" in 1842. In 1867, the Mission Covenant of Sweden established a church and school south of the current site of Golovin. Around 1890, John Dexter established a trading post that became the center for swapping prospecting information for the entire Seward Peninsula. Gold was discovered in 1898 at Council and Golovin became a supply point for the gold fields. Supplies were unloaded from ships at Golovin and shipped across Golovnin Lagoon and up the Fish and Niukluk Rivers to Council.

When gold was discovered in what is now Nome, much of the mining and shipping activity moved there and Golovin declined in population.

Reindeer herding was introduced in the area about 1900.

Golovin is used as a checkpoint on the Iditarod in Nome, Alaska.

Notable people
Donny Olson, Alaska State Senator, attorney, commercial pilot, physician, and reindeer herder.

References

External links

 Subsistence wildlife harvests in five northwest Alaska communities, 2001-2003 : results of a household survey / by Kawerak, Inc., Maniilaq Association, and the Alaska Department of Fish and Game ; by Susan Georgette ... [et al.]. Hosted by Alaska State Publications Program.

Cities in Alaska
Cities in Nome Census Area, Alaska
Mining communities in Alaska
Populated coastal places in Alaska on the Pacific Ocean
Populated places in Russian America
Populated places in the Seward Peninsula